Zaidatul Husniah Zulkifli (born 20 August 1993) is a Malaysian sprinter who primarily competes in the 100 metres and 200 metres and 4 × 100 metres relay.

She competed at the 2016 Summer Olympics in Rio de Janeiro, in the women's 100 metres.

Early years
Zaidatul Husniah was born on 20 August 1993 in Alor Setar, Kedah, the daughter of Zulkifli Hassan and Zalimah Ibrahim. She has a twin sister named Zaidatul Husna who was born 15 minutes earlier. Zaidatul Husniah got her early education in Sekolah Kebangsaan Seri Relau, Penang.

Personal life
Zaidatul Husniah's twin sister Zaidatul Husna is also a national sprinter for Malaysia. She currently studies Physical Education at Universiti Putra Malaysia.

International competitions

References

External links
 
 Zaidatul Husniah Zulkifli at All-Athletics.com

1993 births
Living people
Malaysian female sprinters
People from Kedah
Olympic athletes of Malaysia
Malaysian people of Malay descent
University of Putra Malaysia alumni
Athletes (track and field) at the 2016 Summer Olympics
Malaysian twins
Twin sportspeople
Athletes (track and field) at the 2018 Commonwealth Games
Southeast Asian Games medalists in athletics
Southeast Asian Games silver medalists for Malaysia
Southeast Asian Games bronze medalists for Malaysia
Athletes (track and field) at the 2018 Asian Games
Competitors at the 2015 Southeast Asian Games
Competitors at the 2017 Southeast Asian Games
Competitors at the 2019 Southeast Asian Games
Asian Games competitors for Malaysia
Commonwealth Games competitors for Malaysia
Olympic female sprinters